Masquerade is the third studio album released by Haitian hip hop musician Wyclef Jean. The album was released on June 18, 2002. The album debuted at number six on the US Billboard 200 chart, making it Jean's highest-charting album.

Singles
The album features the singles "Two Wrongs", "Pussycat" and "Knockin' On Heaven's Door". Tom Jones makes a guest appearance on the album, singing his rendition of "Pussycat".

Commercial performance
Masquerade debuted at number six on the US Billboard 200 chart, selling 82,000 copies in its first week of release. This became Jean’s second US top-ten album on the chart.  
The album also debuted at number two on the US Top R&B/Hip-Hop Albums chart. As of May 2003, the album has sold 357,000 copies in the United States.

Track listing

Charts

Weekly charts

Year-end charts

References

2002 albums
Albums produced by Wyclef Jean
Wyclef Jean albums
Albums produced by Jerry Duplessis
Columbia Records albums